Heat shock protein beta-3 (HspB3) also known as heat shock 27kDa protein 3 is a protein that in humans is encoded by the HSPB3 gene.

Function 
This gene encodes a muscle-specific small heat shock protein.

Clinical significance 
A mutation in this gene is the cause of autosomal dominant distal hereditary motor neuropathy type 2C.

References

Further reading